Julia Stoschek (born 1975) is a German socialite and art collector.

Career

Julia Stoschek was born in 1975, the daughter of Michael Stoschek, the German billionaire businessman and chairman of Brose Fahrzeugteile.  

Stoschek first began buying art in 2003. Her collection features more than 850 works by about 250, mainly European and US artists working from the 1960s onwards and includes video, multi-media environments, internet-based installations and performance. Within the first ten years from 2007 until 2017, the Julia Stoschek Collection staged 15 exhibitions, including solo shows of Cao Fei (2009), Derek Jarman (2010), Sturtevant (2014), Wu Tsang (2015) and Cyprien Gaillard (2015).

In 2016, the Julia Stoschek Collection opened a satellite exhibition space in a former Czech cultural center in Berlin. The space has in the past shown solo shows by artists including Arthur Jafa (2018). 

The Julia Stoschek Collection co-sponsored two exhibitions in the German Pavilion at the Venice Biennale: Fabrik (2015) curated by Florian Ebner and Faust (2017) by Anne Imhof.

Controversy
The source of Stochek's family fortune came under international scrutiny in 2022. Stochek's great-grandfather Max Brose, the founder of Brose Fahrzeugteile, was a member of the Nazi Party and employed prisoners-of-war as slave laborers in his factory during World War II. He was designated a Wehrwirtschaftsführer by Nazi government. At the end of the war he was tried and convicted as a Mitläufer.

Other activities
 Museum of Contemporary Art, Los Angeles, Member of the Board of Trustees (since 2018)
 Kunst-Werke Institute for Contemporary Art, Member of the Board (since 2015)
 MoMA PS1, Member of the Board of Trustees
 Tate, Member of the International Council (since 2015)

Recognition
 2012 – Montblanc de la Culture Arts Patronage Award
 2018 – Art Cologne Prize

Personal life
From 2006 until 2010, Stoschek was in a relationship with Andreas Gursky. From 2011, she dated art dealer Max Mayer. She has a son with Mathias Döpfner, with whom she was in a relationship from 2013 to 2018.

References

1975 births
Living people
German art collectors
Women art collectors
21st-century art collectors
People from Coburg